The second series of the Australian cooking game show Celebrity MasterChef Australia premiered on 10 October 2021. Andy Allen, Melissa Leong and Jock Zonfrillo reprised their roles as judges from the main series of the show.

Former AFL player Nick Riewoldt won the series, winning $100,000 for charity Maddie Riewoldt’s Vision.

Contestants
In May 2021, Network Ten announced that the celebrity cooks would include a legendary sports person, an Aussie icon and a famous actor.

On 17 June 2021, Network Ten announced the ten celebrity contestants competing on the second series of the show.

Guest Chefs

Elimination chart

Episodes and ratings

References

MasterChef Australia
2021 Australian television seasons